Shadow of the Red Baron is the third studio album by Belgian band Iron Mask, released on December 16, 2009 by Lion Music. All songs were composed by Dushan Petrossi.

Track listing
 "Shadow of the Red Baron" – 07:04
 "Dreams" – 4:32
 "Forever in the Dark" – 5:11
 "Resurrection" – 5:07
 "Sahara" – 4:21
 "Black Devil Ship" – 4:31
 "We Will Meet Again" – 4:33
 "Universe" – 4:51
 "My Angel Is Gone" – 4:16
 "Only the Good Die Young" – 3:56
 "Ghost of the Tzar" – 6:54

Personnel
Dushan Petrossi - all guitars
Goetz "Valhalla jr" Mohr - lead vocals
Oliver Hartmann - lead vocals on 2, backing vocals
Andreas Lindahl - keyboards
Vassili Moltchanov - bass
Erik Stout - drums
Roma Siadletski - extreme vocals
Lars Eric Mattsson - guitar solo on 5

Production
Production - Dushan Petrossi
Mix & mastering - Jens Bogren at Fascination Street Studios, Sweden
Guitars, bass, orchestral parts recorded - The Iron Kingdom Studio, Brussels, Belgium
Drums recorded - Het Paand Studio, Rotterdam, Holland
Keyboards recorded - Andreas Lindahl, Sweden
Vocals recorded - Oliver Hartmann at Alive Studio, Germany
Front cover, booklet design - Eric Phillippe

References

Iron Mask (band) albums
2009 albums
Cultural depictions of Manfred von Richthofen